The women's downhill event was part of the alpine skiing at the 1952 Winter Olympics program, and was the second appearance of the event. The competition was held at Norefjell Ski Resort near Krødsherad, Norway, on Sunday, 17 February. Forty-two alpine skiers from 13 nations competed.

Austria's Trude Jochum-Beiser won the gold medal, Annemarie Buchner of Germany took the silver, and Giuliana Minuzzo of Italy was the bronze medalist.

Results
Sunday, 17 February 1952

The race was started at 13:00 local time, (UTC +1).

References

External links
Official Olympic Report
 

Women's alpine skiing at the 1952 Winter Olympics
Oly
Alp